A Pocketful of Dreams is the debut album by the English boy band Big Fun.  It was released in 1990 and reached the Top 10 of the UK Albums Chart, peaking at #7.

The album includes their UK Top 40 hit singles "Blame It on the Boogie" (a cover of The Jacksons' 1978 hit), "Can't Shake the Feeling" and "Handful of Promises". Also included is their cover of "Hey There Lonely Girl", which was released as a single but stalled at #62 in the UK.

The group never released any other albums.

In 2010 the album was released by the Cherry Pop label, including unreleased and rare songs, among them their duet with Sonia, "You've Got a Friend", which was released as a charity single in 1990, and a cover of the Carole King song of the same name which both artists also recorded but was never released.

Track listing

 "Handful of Promises"
 "Blame It on the Boogie" (12")
 "Can't Shake the Feeling"
 "Fight for the Right to Party"
 "Not That Kinda Guy"
 "We're in This Love Forever"
 "Why Did You Break My Heart"
 "Bring Your Love Back"
 "The Heaven I Need"
 "Hey There Lonely Girl"
 "I Feel the Earth Move" (CD and Cassette bonus track)

2010 re-release (Cherry Pop records)

 "Handful of Promises"
 "Blame It on the Boogie"
 "Can't Shake the Feeling"
 "Fight for the Right to Party"
 "Not That Kinda Guy"
 "We're in This Love Forever"
 "Why Did You Break My Heart"
 "Bring Your Love Back"
 "The Heaven I Need"
 "Hey There Lonely Girl"
 "You've Got a Friend" (with Sonia)
 "I Feel the Earth Move (Club Mix) *"
 "Blame It on the Boogie (PWL Mix)"
 "Can't Shake the Feeling (12" Remix) *"
 "Handful of Promises (12" Version)"
 "I Feel the Earth Move (The Techno Mix) +"
 "You've Got a Friend (Cover version) (with Sonia)+ "
+ Previously unreleased
* First time on CD

Charts

Weekly charts

Certifications

References

1990 debut albums
Polydor Records albums
Big Fun (band) albums
Albums produced by Stock Aitken Waterman